Krombach may refer to the following places in Germany:

Krombach, Bavaria, in the Aschaffenburg district, Bavaria
Krombach, Thuringia, in the Eichsfeld district, Thuringia
Kreuztal-Krombach, a locality in Kreuztal, in the Siegen-Wittgenstein district, North Rhine-Westphalia

It may also refer to:
the former German name for Krompach, Czech Republic
Krombach (river), a river in Bavaria, Germany